Erion Sadiku (born 23 January 2002) is a Kosovan professional footballer who plays as a midfielder for Swedish club Örgryte.

Club career

Varbergs BoIS
On 13 October 2017, Sadiku signed his first professional contract with Superettan side Varbergs BoIS after agreeing to a three-year deal. On 19 June 2018, he made his debut in a 3–3 home draw against Helsingborgs IF after coming on as a substitute at last minutes in place of Adama Fofana.

Genoa
On 1 February 2021, Sadiku signed a two-and-a-half year contract with Campionato Primavera 1 club Genoa Youth Sector. His debut with Genoa Youth Sector came two days later in the 2020–21 Coppa Italia Primavera round of 16 against Parma Youth Sector after being named in the starting line-up.

Örgryte
On 1 August 2022, Sadiku signed a three-and-a-half year contract with Superettan club Örgryte. Sadiku missed Örgryte's first matches of the league against AFC Eskilstuna and Örebro as the club could not register him and five days after the transfer, he was registered. His debut with Örgryte came on 13 August in a 1–2 away win against Dalkurd after being named in the starting line-up. Fourteen days after debut, Sadiku scored his first goal for Örgryte in his third appearance for the club in a 1–1 away draw over Västerås in Superettan.

International career
On 29 August 2020, Sadiku received a call-up from Kosovo U21 for the 2021 UEFA European Under-21 Championship qualification match against England, he was an unused substitute in that match.

Career statistics

Club

References

External links

2002 births
Living people
Kosovan men's footballers
Kosovo under-21 international footballers
Kosovan expatriate footballers
Kosovan expatriate sportspeople in Italy
Swedish men's footballers
Swedish expatriate footballers
Swedish expatriate sportspeople in Italy
Swedish people of Kosovan descent
Swedish people of Albanian descent
Association football midfielders
Superettan players
Örgryte IS players
Allsvenskan players
Varbergs BoIS players